Donald Macaulay, Baron Macaulay of Bragar, QC (14 November 1933 – 12 June 2014) was a British Labour politician and member of the House of Lords.

He was educated at Clydebank High School and Glasgow University, where he read law. He became an advocate at the Scottish Bar in 1963 and a Queen's Counsel in 1975.

He contested Inverness at the 1970 general election. He served on the Bryden Committee on the visual identification of suspects following the Devlin Report of 1976.

He was created a life peer as Baron Macaulay of Bragar, of Bragar in the County of Ross and Cromarty on 9 January 1989. He served as Opposition spokesman for Scottish Legal Affairs in the 1990s.

Lord Macaulay died on 12 June 2014.

References
Parliament.uk Biography
Burke's Peerage

1933 births
2014 deaths
Labour Party (UK) life peers
People educated at Clydebank High School
Scottish King's Counsel
Scottish barristers
Alumni of the University of Glasgow
Life peers created by Elizabeth II